The Yokohama Giga Spirits are a Japanese corporate basketball team based in Yokohama, Kanagawa.

History

Akita Isuzu Motors 1955-1987

Akita Isuzu Motors basketball team was founded by Shozaburo Makinae in 1955. Makinae currently serves as a director and corporate adviser for the Akita Northern Happinets of B.League. They practiced at Sannoh Junior High School gymnasium in 1960's and 1970's.

Head coaches
Mototaka Kohama
Shiro Yoshii
Shigeyoshi Kasahara
Hyokichi Tsuji V

Notable players
Vince Brookins -Louisville vs Iowa
Jack Givens(JBL2 MVP, Best5, Scoring Leader) 
Derrick Hord - Drafted in the third round of the NBA draft by the Cleveland Cavaliers - Louisville vs Kentucky 1983
Mitsuhiko Kato
Hirohide Matsuoka
Kazuo Nakamura
Taku Umetsu
Lavon Williams (JBL2 Best5) -Denver, Colorado,  Drafted in the fifth round of the NBA draft by the Cleveland Cavaliers -  1980 UK @ LSU 2/24, Wood Carvings 
Ted Young (JBL MVP, Best5, 1988)

Honors and titles
JBL2
Champions (1): 1983
Runners-up (1): 1982
Emperor's Cup
Champions (1): 1984
Runners-up (1): 1986
3rd place (1): 1987
Japan Industrial and Commercial Basketball Federation Championships
Runners-up (1): 1981
National Sports Festival of Japan
Champions (2):

Isuzu Motors Lynx/Giga Cats 1987-2002

The team moved to Yokohama, Kanagawa in 1987. The club enjoyed its golden age winning JBL championships 6 times.  Isuzu shut down their basketball and baseball clubs in 2002.

Head coach
Mototaka Kohama
Dwane Casey (1992-94)
Due to the Emery scandal in 1989, Kohama and Casey were reunited.

Notable players
Dan Bingenheimer - Highlights
Dave Butler
Casey Calvary
Richard Coffey
Anthony Cook (basketball)
Lucius Davis (JBL MVP, 1998)
Terry Dozier
Toshihiro Goto
Reggie Hanson
Makoto Hasegawa (JBL Rookie of the year, 1994)
Brian Hendrick -  Cal vs Duke 
Mike Higgins
Cedric Jenkins
Makoto Minamiyama
Hiroshi Nagano
Ernest Nzigmasabo

Julius Nwosu
Tadaharu Ogawa
Dale Roberts
A.J. Rollins
Yukihiro Sakka (JBL Rookie of the year, 1988)
Kenichi Sako
Satoshi Sakumoto
Toru Shioya
Anthony Smith
Michael Takahashi -  Highlights
Kenny Walker (JBL Best5, 1996)
Joe Wallace
Wang Libin

Honors and titles
JBL
Champions (6): 1988, 1995,1996, 1997, 1998, 2000
Runners-up (2): 1999. 2001
Emperor's Cup
Champions (5): 1994, 1996, 1998, 1999, 2001
3rd place (2): 1990, 2002
ABC Champions Cup
Runners-up (1): 1996
4th place (1): 1997
ABA Club Championship
Runners-up (1): 2001

Yokohama Giga Cats 2002-2005
Kohama led the revamped Giga Cats, after Isuzu dropped sponsorship, as a club team until 2005.

Notable players
Yoshihiko Amano
Kenji Hilke
Haruyuki Ishibashi
Hirokazu Nema
Masahiro Ohara
Taku Saito

Yokohama Giga Spirits 2005-present

Notable players
Minoru Kimura (basketball)
Masahiro Ohara

References

External links 

JBL Final Isuzu Giga Cats vs Toyota Alvark
Basketball teams in Japan
Isuzu
Sport in Akita (city)
Sports teams in Akita Prefecture
Sports teams in Kanagawa Prefecture